The microSPARC (code-named Tsunami) is a discontinued microprocessor implementing the SPARC V8 instruction set architecture (ISA), developed by Sun Microsystems. It is a low-end microprocessor intended for low-end workstations and embedded systems. The microprocessor was developed by Sun, but the floating-point unit (FPU) was licensed from  Meiko Scientific. It contains 800,000 transistors.

There are two derivatives of the microSPARC-II (code-named Swift): the microSPARC-II and microSPARC-IIep. The microSPARC-II is used in the SPARCstation 5. The microSPARC-IIep is a 100 MHz microSPARC-II with an integrated PCI controller for embedded systems. It was developed and fabricated by LSI Logic for Sun, and used in their JavaStation Network Computer.

References 

 Sun Microsystems, Inc. (10 August 1992). "Highly Integrated SPARC Processor Implementation (Tsunami)". Hot Chips presentation.'

Sun microprocessors
SPARC microprocessors
32-bit microprocessors